The following is a summary of Down county football team's 2009 season.

Kits

Competitions

Dr McKenna Cup

Results

Table

Rounds

Matches and reports

National Football League Division 3

Final

Ulster Senior Football Championship

Rounds

Results

All-Ireland Senior Football Championship

Qualifiers

References

Down
Gaelic
Down county football team seasons